In 2002, Sony and Microsoft were sued by Immersion for patent infringement for the use of vibration functions in their gaming controllers. Both patents were continuation applications of a patent application originally filed in November 1995. Nintendo was not involved in the case, as the technology used in the Rumble Pak and GameCube controller (and, subsequently, the Wii Remote) is based on a different design, for which Nintendo holds the patents  and  based on a Japan patent application filed on October 9, 1995.

While Microsoft settled out of court, purchasing a 10 percent share in Immersion, Sony continued to defend the case.  Immersion's lead attorney in this case was Morgan Chu. The defense centered on a force feedback controller patent which Sony licensed from Logitech during 1998. Sony lost, with the jury awarding Immersion $82 million for the seven years that the DualShock controller had been on the market, which with the judge's addition of pre-judgment interest and costs, totalled $90.7 million. In addition, the judgment required Sony to suspend the sale of all controllers containing Immersion-patented technology, including all PlayStation and PlayStation 2 console packages. Sony appealed this decision and has been able to sell its products while the appeal was being heard. On March 8, 2006, Sony lost the appeal at the US District Court level and subsequently appealed to the US Court of Appeals for the Federal Circuit. The order to halt sales of the infringing controllers was again stayed pending the outcome of the appeal.

At E3 2006, Sony announced that vibration functionality would be removed from the PlayStation 3 controller, reasoning that the vibration would interfere with the motion-sensing feature of the controller. It has been speculated that the removal of vibration is related to the lawsuit, and Immersion President Victor Viegas has been dismissive of Sony's stated rationale.

On March 1, 2007, Sony Computer Entertainment and Immersion Corporation announced that both companies have agreed to end their patent litigation, and have entered a business agreement to "explore the inclusion of Immersion technology in PlayStation format products."  As part of the agreement reached between the two companies, Immersion will receive the full amount dictated by the District Court, which with interest is stated to total $97.2 million, in addition to royalties. On top of the $30.6 million in compulsory license fees which Sony had paid Immersion over the previous two years, Sony will make 12 more licensing payments through the end of 2009 totaling $22.5 million, during which other royalties may also be paid.
The agreement also provides Sony with new rights with respect to Immersion's patents. The termination of the litigation will have no material impact on Sony's consolidated earnings forecast announced on January 30, 2007.

References

External links
Immerson company website

2006 in United States case law
United States District Court for the Northern District of California cases
United States patent case law
Sony litigation
Microsoft litigation